I Cry is a 2008 EP by Rotersand.

Track listing 
"I Cry (Rework)" - 5:32
"Call Me Stupid" - 5:14
"I Am With You (Stripped Edit)" - 4:04
"I Cry (Evendorff Remix)" - 7:11
"Rushing (Club Recut)" - 5:08
"Mission (Feat. Jay Smith)" - 6:30
"Shelter (Autoaggression Remix)" - 6:14
"Inner World (Krilf Oderberg Dub)"  - 6:37

Personnel 
 Rascal Nikov
 Gunther Gerl
 Krischan

References 

2008 EPs
Rotersand albums